Tarnava may refer to:

 Tarnava, Vratsa Province, a village in Vratsa Province, Bulgaria
 Tarnava, Yambol Province, a village in Yambol Province, Bulgaria

See also
 Târnava (disambiguation)
 Trnava (disambiguation)